Evesham Friends Meeting House is a historic Quaker meeting house at Moorestown-Mt. Laurel and Hainesport-Mt. Laurel Roads (Evesboro Road) in Mount Laurel, New Jersey.

The meeting house was built in 1760 from local sandstone and expanded in 1798. It is the second oldest extent Quaker meeting house in Burlington County. The original meeting house on the site was built in 1698 behind the current building. A movable partition divides the older, eastern section from the newer section.  During the Orthodox-Hicksite split, adherents of the Orthodox view met in the older section, while the Hicksites met in the newer section. It was added to the National Register of Historic Places in 1982.

See also
National Register of Historic Places listings in Burlington County, New Jersey

References

External links

Evesham Friends Meeting House, Mount Laurel Road, Mount Laurel, Burlington County, NJ, Historic American Buildings Survey

18th-century Quaker meeting houses
Churches completed in 1760
Churches in Burlington County, New Jersey
Churches on the National Register of Historic Places in New Jersey
Mount Laurel, New Jersey
National Register of Historic Places in Burlington County, New Jersey
Quaker meeting houses in New Jersey